The following tables compare software used for plagiarism detection.

General

References

Educational assessment and evaluation
Plagiarism detectors
Anti-plagiarism
Software law